Ridhwan Fikri Aban (born 29 April 1999) is a Singaporean footballer who is currently playing as a goalkeeper for Young Lions FC.

Club
He signed for the Young Lions in 2018 before joining GFA FC for 2019.  He went on to be promoted to the senior squad before making 20 appearances in the 2018 season.

Career statistics

Club

Notes

International Statistics

U-23 international caps

U19 International caps

References

Living people
1999 births
Singaporean footballers
Association football goalkeepers
Singapore Premier League players
Young Lions FC players
Competitors at the 2021 Southeast Asian Games
Southeast Asian Games competitors for Singapore